Manaca, written in lower-case letters,  is a rechargeable contactless smart card used in Nagoya, Japan and the surrounding area since February 11, 2011, when it replaced the Tranpass magnetic fare card system. As of March 23, 2013, it became compatible with 9 other IC cards, allowing it to be used nationwide.

Etymology

The name comes from the Japanese word , meaning "center", because Nagoya is roughly in the center of Japan, and because it claims to be a central part of your lifestyle. The name, even in Japanese, is written in Roman letters as "manaca", usually with a lowercase "m".

Usage
Manaca has a feature set similar to other prepaid IC Cards used across the country. It provides a convenient method of payment for train and bus fares while also being accepted as payment at some shops, restaurants, and vending machines.

Manaca cards can be purchased from ticket machines located in subway, city bus and Meitetsu bus and train stations, and are available in both registered and unregistered form. Registered cards require the buyer to provide their name, date of birth, gender, and phone number, but can be replaced if lost or stolen. A registered card is also required in order to purchase a commuter pass. When a new or replacement card is issued, a 500 yen deposit is required. This deposit is refundable if the card is returned. Once it has been issued, credit can be added by inserting it into a compatible credit terminal at any station, choosing the amount to add, and then inserting bills.

Points

There are two kinds of point systems for Manaca cards: mileage points and Tamarun points. The point systems vary depending on the card's maker, either MIC or the Nagoya Transportation Development Organization. The maker of the card is printed on the back of the card in the bottom left.

All cards accumulate mileage points whereas MIC cards can, when registered, also accumulate Tamarun points.

Mileage points are accumulated from spending money stored on the manaca card as transportation fare, such as from riding the subway or non-JR trains. These points are calculated each month and are sent to the "point center" every month on the 10th, they are not automatically credited to the card. In order to use them as fare, they must be transferred to the card, which can be done at a charging station, ticket machine or ticket window. Despite interoperability with JR Central's TOICA service, points cannot be used for JR train fare and are not accumulated by using JR services.

However, cards issued by MIC, once registered online, can also accumulate Tamarun points through purchases paid for with the card at participating vendors. Once acquired, Tamarun points can be used at these vendors to make purchases of goods, but unlike mileage points, these points cannot automatically be used as transportation fare.

Points are also preserved when a registered card is replaced due to loss or theft.

Discounts
When making the following transfers within 90 minutes using a single manaca card, an 80 yen discount is applied:
 City bus ↔ City bus 
 City bus ↔ Subway 
 City bus ↔ Aonami line 
 Subway ↔ Aonami line 
 City bus ↔ Yutorito Line Raised Zone (Ozone - Obata Ryokuchi) 
 Subway ↔ Yutorito Line Raised Zone (Ozone - Obata Ryokuchi)

Scope
As of March 23, 2013, the Manaca card began interoperability with nine other major Japanese IC cards, allowing it to be used nationwide. In the Nagoya area, it can be used on the following transportation systems:

 Nagoya Municipal Subway lines
 Nagoya Railroad (Meitetsu) lines
 Aonami Line
 Nagoya City Bus
 Meitetsu Bus
 Yutorito Line
 Toyohashi Railroad
 Linimo

See also
 Tranpass (the predecessor to Manaka in Nagoya)
 TOICA
 Suica
 PiTaPa
 ICOCA

References

External links
 Details on Nagoya City Transportation Bureau website 

Fare collection systems in Japan
Contactless smart cards
Smart cards introduced in 2011
Transport in Nagoya